Hemiauchenia  is a genus of laminoid camelids that evolved in North America in the Miocene period about 10 million years ago. This genus diversified and moved to South America in the Late Pliocene approximately 3 to 2 million years ago, as part of the Great American Biotic Interchange, giving rise to modern lamines. The genus became extinct at the end of the Pleistocene.

Broad features of genus Hemiauchenia 
Species are specified using Latin adjectives or Latinised names from other languages.

North American fossils 
 
Remains of these species have been found in assorted locations around North America, including Florida, Texas, Kansas, Nebraska, Arizona, Mexico, California, Oklahoma, New Mexico, Oregon, Colorado, and Washington. The "large-headed llama", H. macrocephala, was widely distributed in North and Central America, with H. vera being known from the western United States and northern Mexico. H. minima has been found in Florida, and H. guanajuatensis in Mexico.

South American fossils 
Fossils of Hemiauchenia in South America are restricted to the Pleistocene and have been found in the Luján and Agua Blanca Formations of Buenos Aires Province and Córdoba Province, Argentina, the Tarija Formation of Bolivia, Pilauco of Osorno, Los Lagos, Chile and Paraíba, Ceará, and the Touro Passo Formation of Rio Grande do Sul, Brazil.

Distinguishing characteristics of members of Hemiauchenia

H. vera ( "true hemiauchenia") 
 Relatively low-crowned teeth (part of visible teeth ends close to gums)
 Large caniniform (canine-like) upper first premolar
 Retention of lower third  premolar

H. blancoensis ("Blancan hemiauchenia") 
 Named for Blancan Age stratum where typically found
 Shorter mandibular diastema (teeth-spacing between incisors and molars) than H. macrocephala and H. vera
 Caniniform upper  first premolar
 Absent second premolar
 Upper third  premolar present or absent
 Lower crowned molars

H. macrocephala ("great-headed hemiauchenia") 
 Possesses a larger skull relative to other species
 Long, robust limbs
 Large skeletal size
 Presence of a deciduous upper second premolar
 Fully molariform deciduous second premolar (its infant bicuspids were like molars)
 High-crowned molars
 Thick layer of cementum on the teeth
 Broad mandibular symphysis (line where the bones of the jaw join together) with incisors in a vertical fashion

H. minima ("least hemiauchenia") 
 Despite being the earliest recognized species, general distinguishing characteristics for H. minima are little known.

Other species 
Also, a few lesser known species, such as H. paradoxa, H. seymourensis, H. edensis and H. guanajuatensis, have been found. According to which source is consulted, these may or may not be considered legitimate taxa.

Classification history 
Prior to 1974, fossil specimens now thought to be Hemiauchenia were classified as Holomeniscus, Lama, and Tanupolama, until S. David Webb proposed that these North and South American fossil species were part of a single genus. This has been accepted by all subsequent researchers, although in 2013, Carolina Saldanha Scherer  questioned the inclusion of a certain North American species and suggested that Hemiauchenia is paraphyletic.

Notes

References

Further reading 
 Honey, J. H., J. A. Harrison, D. R. Prothero, and M. S. Stevens. 1998. Camelidae. pp. 439–462. In: Evolution of Tertiary Mammals of North America, Eds: C. M. Janis, K. M. Scott, and L. L. Jacobs, Cambridge University Press, Cambridge, United Kingdom. 691 pp.
 Hulbert, R. C. 1992. A checklist of the fossil vertebrates of Florida. Papers in Florida Paleontology, no. 6:25-26.
 Kurtén, B. and E. Anderson. 1980. Pleistocene Mammals of North America. Columbia University Press, NY, 442 pp. (camels - 301, 306-307).
 Meachen, Julie A. "A New Species of Hemiauchenia (Camelidae; Lamini) " Diss. University of Florida, 2003. Abstract
 McKenna, M. C. and S. K. Bell. 1997. Classification of Mammals above the Species Level. Columbia University Press, NY, 631 pp. (camels - pp. 413–416). 
 Nowak, R. M. 1999. Walker's Book of Mammals, vol. 1. Johns Hopkins University Press, Baltimore, pp. 837 – 1936. (camels - pp. 1072–1081)

Prehistoric camelids
Prehistoric even-toed ungulate genera
Miocene even-toed ungulates
Pleistocene even-toed ungulates
Miocene mammals of North America
Pliocene mammals of North America
Pleistocene mammals of North America
Neogene Mexico
Neogene United States
Pleistocene El Salvador
Pleistocene Mexico
Pleistocene United States
Fossils of Canada
Fossils of El Salvador
Fossils of Mexico
Fossils of the United States
Pleistocene mammals of South America
Lujanian
Ensenadan
Uquian
Pleistocene Argentina
Fossils of Argentina
Pleistocene Bolivia
Fossils of Bolivia
Pleistocene Brazil
Fossils of Brazil
Fossil taxa described in 1880
Taxa named by Florentino Ameghino
Ringold Formation Miocene Fauna